Augustusburg Castle may refer to:
 Augustusburg Hunting Lodge, a castle built from 1568-1572 near Chemnitz, Saxony, Germany.
 Augustusburg and Falkenlust Palaces, Brühl, a complex of palaces and a World Heritage Site built in the early 18th century in Brühl, North Rhine-Westphalia, Germany.